Mars is a hard science-fiction television series produced by National Geographic that premiered on November 14, 2016, on its channel and FX. Prior to its official airdate, it was launched in a streaming format on November 1, 2016. It blends elements of real interviews with a fictional story of a group of astronauts as they land on the planet Mars.

The series is based on the Stephen Petranek book How We'll Live on Mars (2015). The fictional narrative alternates initially between the years 2016 and 2033, using present-day non-fiction interviews to explain events unfolding in the story. The series was filmed in Budapest and Morocco.

A companion book to the series, Mars: Our Future on the Red Planet (October 2016), details the science behind the show. A prequel episode, called Before Mars, was produced and released conjointly with the series. It tells the fictional story of a moment in the life of one of the astronauts and the decisions she made to get involved in science.

On January 13, 2017, it was announced that National Geographic had renewed the series for a second season, which premiered on November 12, 2018.

The lead actress, Jihae, confirmed via her official Instagram that the series was canceled after only two seasons.

Premise
In the year 2033, a crew of six astronauts launch from Florida on a journey to be the first people to set foot on Mars. During the descent into the Martian atmosphere, there is a malfunction with their spacecraft, the Daedalus. They land 75.3 kilometers away from their planned habitat. On Earth, their progress is being monitored. In the second season, the story jumps ahead several years into the future after the Daedalus astronauts have built a full-fledged colony called Olympus Town. Having established humankind as an interplanetary species, Season 2 examines the impact that humans have on the Red Planet and the consequences the planet has on us.

Intermixed with the story is interview footage of real-life figures in the present, as well as of the fictional crew and their mission control. The real-life present-day interviews are with various scientists, engineers, and other public figures, such as Elon Musk, Susan Wise Bauer, Andy Weir, Robert Zubrin, and Neil deGrasse Tyson, among others, about the difficulties that the crew might face on a journey to, and living on, Mars.

Cast
The cast for the fictional part of the first season includes:
 Ben Cotton as Ben Sawyer, American mission commander and systems engineer.
 Jihae Kim as
 Hana Seung, American mission pilot and systems engineer, later mission commander, and
 Joon Seung, her twin sister and CAPCOM of mission control on Earth, later secretary-general of International Mars Science Foundation, the multi-nation organization funding the Mars expedition.
 Clémentine Poidatz as Amelie Durand, French mission physician and biochemist. 
 Sammi Rotibi as Robert Foucault, Nigerian mission engineer and roboticist.
 Alberto Ammann as Javier Delgado, Spanish mission hydrologist and geochemist.
 Anamaria Marinca as Marta Kamen, Russian mission exobiologist and geologist.
 Olivier Martinez as Ed Grann, CEO of the Mars Missions Corporation, consortium of private aerospace companies preparing Mars expeditions.
  as Leslie Richardson, a logistical engineer who joins the expedition to oversee the base's expansion. In Season 2, she becomes secretary-general of International Mars Science Foundation.

With the exception of Martinez and Cotton, all of these actors returned for the second season, which started production in July 2017.

Season 2 
Esai Morales as Roland St. John, CEO of Lukrum.
Jeff Hephner as Kurt Hurrelle, commander of the Lukrum Mars mission.
Roxy Sternberg as Jen Carson, one of the Lukrum workers.

Production
The series music is composed by Nick Cave and Warren Ellis. The soundtrack for the first season was released on November 11, 2016.

For the second season, Dee Johnson took over as showrunner. Stephen Cragg and Ashley Way joined returning director Everardo Gout. Esai Morales, Roxy Sternberg, Gunnar Cauthery, Levi Fiehler, Evan Hall, Akbar Kurtha and Jeff Hephner joined the Season 2 cast.

The second season premiered in the UK and Belgium on November 11, 2018, and in the US on November 12.

Episodes

Prequel (2016)

Season 1 (2016)

Season 2 (2018)

Special (2018)

Reception

Critical response
The first season of Mars received mixed reviews, holding a 61% approval rating on Rotten Tomatoes with an average score of 7.33/10 based on 18 reviews; in 2018, the critical consensus stated: "Ron Howard's direction ensures that Mars is an attractive endeavor, even if the show struggles to move smoothly between its documentary and fictional elements."

On Metacritic, the first season has received a score of 59 out of 100 based on 14 reviews, indicating "mixed or average reviews".

Accolades

See also

Factual 
 Falcon 9 flight 20, a flight of Falcon 9 that landed an orbital class booster on land for the first time in history, shown on the final episode of the first season of Mars
 SpaceX Starship, in development by SpaceX
 Space Launch System (SLS), in development by NASA and Boeing
 Mars Design Reference Mission, the standing NASA plans for hypothetical crewed missions to Mars

Fictional 
 Away (TV series)
 The Expanse (TV series)
 The First (TV series)

References

External links
 
 

2016 American television series debuts
2018 American television series endings
2010s American science fiction television series
Television series set in the 2030s
Fiction set in 2033
English-language television shows
Science education television series
Television series about outer space
Mars in television
National Geographic (American TV channel) original programming
Neil deGrasse Tyson
Television series about space programs
Television series by Imagine Entertainment
Television series about astronauts